Litozamia tropis is a species of sea snail, a marine gastropod mollusk in the family Muricidae, the murex snails or rock snails.

Description
The length of the shell attains 4.2 mm.

Distribution
This marine species occurs off New Caledonia.

References

 Houart, R. (1995). The Trophoninae (Gastropoda: Muricidae) of the New Caledonia region. in: Bouchet, P. (Ed.) Résultats des Campagnes MUSORSTOM 14. Mémoires du Muséum national d'Histoire naturelle. Série A, Zoologie. 167: 459-498

Litozamia
Gastropods described in 1995